A bidet ( or ) is a bowl or receptacle designed to be sat on in order to wash one's genitalia, perineum, inner buttocks, and anus. The modern variety has a plumbed-in water supply and a drainage opening, and is thus a plumbing fixture subject to local hygiene regulations. The bidet is designed to promote personal hygiene and is used after defecation, and before and after sexual intercourse. It can also be used to wash feet, with or without filling it up with water. In several European countries, a bidet is now required by law to be present in every bathroom containing a toilet bowl. It was originally located in the bedroom, near the chamber-pot and the marital bed, but in modern times is located near the toilet bowl in the bathroom. Fixtures that combine a toilet seat with a washing facility include the electronic bidet.

Opinions as to the necessity of the bidet vary widely over different nationalities and cultures. In those cultures which use it habitually, such as in parts of Western, Central and Southern Europe, Eastern Asia and some South American countries such as Argentina, it is considered an indispensable tool in maintaining good personal hygiene. It is commonly used in North African countries such as Egypt. Rarely is it used in sub-Saharan Africa and North America.

"Bidet" is a French loanword meaning "pony" due to the straddling position adopted in its usage.

Applications
Bidets are primarily used to wash and clean the genitalia, perineum, inner buttocks, and anus. Some bidets have a vertical jet intended to give easy access for washing and rinsing the perineum and anal area. The traditional separate bidet is like a wash-basin which is filled with clean water, and may then be used for many other purposes such as washing feet.

Types

Bidet shower 

A bidet shower (also known as "bidet spray", "bidet sprayer", or "health faucet") is a hand-held triggered nozzle, similar to that on a kitchen sink sprayer, that delivers a spray of water to assist in anal cleansing and cleaning the genitals after defecation and urination. In contrast to a bidet that is integrated with the toilet, a bidet shower has to be held by the hands, and cleaning does not take place automatically. Bidet showers are common in countries where water is considered essential for anal cleansing.

Drawbacks include the possibility of wetting a user's clothing if used carelessly. In addition, a user must be reasonably mobile and flexible to use a hand-held bidet shower.

Conventional or standalone bidet

A bidet is a plumbing fixture that is installed as a separate unit in the bathroom besides toilet, shower and sink, which users have to straddle. Some bidets resemble a large hand basin, with taps and a stopper so they can be filled up; other designs have a nozzle that squirts a jet of water to aid in cleansing.

Add-on bidets  

There are bidets that are attachable to toilet bowls, saving space and obviating additional plumbing. A bidet may be a movable or fixed nozzle, either attached to an existing toilet on the back or side toilet rim, or replacing the toilet seat. In these cases, its use is restricted to cleaning the anus and genitals. Some bidets of this type produce a vertical water jet and others a more-or-less oblique one. Other bidets have one nozzle on the side rim aimed at both anal and genital areas, and other designs have two nozzles on the back rim. The shorter one, called the "family nozzle", is used for washing the area around the anus, and the longer one ("bidet nozzle") is designed for washing the vulva.

Such attachable bidets (also called "combined toilets", "bidet attachments", or "add-on bidets") are controlled either mechanically, by turning a valve, or electronically. Electronic bidets are controlled with waterproof electrical switches rather than a manual valve. There are models that have a heating element which blows warm air to dry the user after washing, that offer heated seats, wireless remote controls, illumination through built in night lights, or built in deodorizers and activated carbon filters to remove odours. Further refinements include adjustable water pressure, temperature compensation, and directional spray control. Where bathroom appearance is of concern, under-the-seat mounting types have become more popular.

An add-on bidet typically connects to the existing water supply of a toilet via the addition of a threaded tee pipe adapter, and requires no soldering or other plumbing work. Electronic add-on bidets also require a GFCI protected grounded electrical outlet.

Usage and health 
Personal hygiene is improved and maintained more accurately and easily with the use of both toilet paper and a bidet as compared to the use of toilet paper alone. In some add-on bidets with vertical jets, little water is used and toilet paper may not be necessary. Addressing hemorrhoids and genital health issues might also be facilitated by the use of bidet fixtures.

Because of the large surface of the basin, after-use and routine disinfection of stand-alone bidets require thoroughness, or microbial contamination from one user to the next could take place. Bidet attachments are sometimes included on hospital toilets because of their utility in maintaining hygiene. Hospitals must consider the use of bidet properly and consider the clinical background of patients to prevent cross-infection. Warm-water bidets may harbor dangerous microbes if not properly disinfected.

Environmental aspects 
From an environmental standpoint, bidets can reduce the need for toilet paper. Considering that an average person uses only  of water for cleansing by using a bidet, much less water is used than for manufacturing toilet paper. An article in Scientific American concluded that using a bidet is "much less stressful on the environment than using paper". Scientific American has also reported that if the US switched to using bidets, 15 million trees could be saved every year.

In the US, UK, and some other countries, wet wipes are heavily marketed as an upgrade from dry toilet paper. However, this product has been criticized for its adverse environmental impact, due to the non-biodegradable plastic fibers composing most versions. Although the wipes are promoted as "flushable", they absorb waste fats and agglomerate into massive "fatbergs" which can clog sewer systems and must be cleared at great expense. Bidets are being marketed as cleaning better than toilet paper or wet wipes with fewer negative environmental effects.

Society and culture
The bidet is common in Catholic countries, especially those influenced by French culture. It is also found in some traditionally Orthodox and Protestant countries such as Greece and Finland respectively, where bidet showers are common.

In Islam, there are many strict rules concerning excretion; in particular anal washing with water is required. Consequently in Middle Eastern regions where Islam is the predominant religion, water for anal washing is provided in most toilets, usually in the form of a hand-held "bidet shower" or shattaf.

Prevalence 

Bidets are becoming increasingly popular with the elderly and disabled. Combined toilet/bidet installations make self-care toileting possible for many people, affording greater independence. There are often special units with higher toilet seats allowing easier wheelchair transfer, and with some form of electronic remote control that benefits an individual with limited mobility or otherwise requiring assistance.

Bidets are common bathroom fixtures in the Arab world and in  predominantly Catholic countries, such as Italy (the installation of a bidet in a bathroom has been mandatory since 1975), Spain (but in recent times new or renewed houses tend to have bathrooms without bidets, except the luxurious ones), and Portugal (installation is mandatory since 1975). They are also found in Southern Eastern Europe in countries like Albania, Bosnia and Herzegovina, Greece and West Asian country, Turkey. They are very popular in some South American countries, particularly Argentina and Uruguay. Electronic bidet-integrated toilets, often with functions such as toilet seat warming, are commonly found in Japan, and are becoming more popular in other Asian countries.

In northern Europe, bidets are rare, although in Finland, bidet showers are common. Bidet showers are most commonly found in South-East Asia, South Asia, and the Middle East.

In 1980, the first "paperless toilet" was launched in Japan by manufacturer Toto, a combination of toilet and bidet which also dries the user after washing. These combination toilet-bidets (washlet) with seat warmers, or attachable bidets are particularly popular in Japan and South Korea, and are found in approximately 76% of Japanese households . They are commonly found in hotels and some public facilities. These bidet-toilets, along with toilet seat and bidet units (to convert an existing toilet) are sold in many countries, including the United States.

Bidet seat conversions are much easier and lower cost to install than traditional bidets, and have disrupted the market for the older fixtures.

After a slow start in the 1990s, electronic bidets are starting to become more available in the United States. American distributors were directly influenced by their Japanese predecessors, as the founders of Brondell (established in 2003) have indicated. The popularity of add-on bidet units is steadily increasing in the United States, Canada and the United Kingdom, in part because of their ability to treat hemorrhoids or urogenital infections. In addition, shortages of toilet paper due to the coronavirus pandemic have led to an increased interest in bidets.

Etymology 
Bidet is a French word for "pony", and in Old French,  meant "to trot". This etymology comes from the notion that one "rides" or straddles a bidet much like a pony is ridden. The word "bidet" was used in 15th century France to refer to the pet ponies that French royalty kept.

History

The bidet appears to have been an invention of French furniture makers in the late 17th century, although no exact date or inventor is known. The earliest written reference to the bidet is in 1726 in Italy. Even though there are records of Maria Carolina of Austria, Queen of Naples and Sicily, requesting a bidet for her personal bathroom in the Royal Palace of Caserta in the second half of the 18th century, the bidet did not become widespread in Italy until after WWII. The bidet is possibly associated with the chamber pot and the bourdaloue, the latter being a small, hand-held chamber pot.

Historical antecedents and early functions of the bidet are believed to include devices used for contraception. Bidets are considered ineffective by today's standards of contraception, and their use for that function was quickly abandoned and forgotten following the advent of modern contraceptives such as the pill.

By 1900, due to plumbing improvements, the bidet (and chamber pot) moved from the bedroom to the bathroom and became more convenient to fill and drain.

In 1928, in the United States, John Harvey Kellogg applied for a patent on an "anal douche". In his application, he used the term to describe a system comparable to what today might be called a bidet nozzle, which can be attached to a toilet to perform anal cleansing with water.

In 1965, the American Bidet Company featured an adjustable spray nozzle and warm water option, seeking to make the bidet a household item. The fixture was expensive, and required floor space to install; it was eventually discontinued without a replacement model.

The early 1980s saw the introduction of the electronic bidet from Japan, with names such as Clean Sense, Galaxy, Infinity, Novita, and of non-electric attachments such as Gobidet. These devices have attachments that connect to existing toilet water supplies, and can be used in bathrooms lacking the space for a separate bidet and toilet. Many models have additional features, such as instant-heating warm water, night lights, or a heated seat.

See also

 Cleanliness
 Ecological sanitation
 Feminine hygiene
 Improved sanitation
 Infection prevention and control
 Istinja
 Public health
 Sustainable sanitation
 Tabo (hygiene)
 Toilet seat
 Toilets in Japan
 Washlet

References

External links

Bathroom equipment
French inventions
Plumbing